Carl Walter Liner (17 August 1914 – 19 April 1997) was a Swiss painter.

References

20th-century Swiss painters
Swiss male painters
1914 births
1997 deaths
20th-century Swiss male artists